In electronics, a transimpedance amplifier (TIA) is a current to voltage converter, almost exclusively implemented with one or more operational amplifiers. The TIA can be used to amplify the current output of Geiger–Müller tubes, photo multiplier tubes, accelerometers, photo detectors and other types of sensors to a usable voltage.    Current to voltage converters are used with sensors that have a current response that is more linear than the voltage response.   This is the case with photodiodes where it is not uncommon for the current response to have better than 1% nonlinearity over a wide range of light input. The transimpedance amplifier presents a low impedance to the photodiode and isolates it from the output voltage of the operational amplifier.   In its simplest form a transimpedance amplifier has just a large valued feedback resistor, Rf.   The gain of the amplifier is set by this resistor and because the amplifier is in an inverting configuration, has a value of -Rf.  There are several different configurations of transimpedance amplifiers, each suited to a particular application.   The one factor they all have in common is the requirement to convert the low-level current of a sensor to a voltage.   The gain, bandwidth, as well as current and voltage offsets change with different types of sensors, requiring different configurations of transimpedance amplifiers.

DC operation

In the circuit shown in figure 1 the photodiode (shown as a current source) is connected between ground and the inverting input of the op-amp.  The other input of the op-amp is also connected to ground. This provides a low-impedance load for the photodiode, which keeps the photodiode voltage low. The photodiode is operating in  photovoltaic mode with no external bias. The high gain of the op-amp keeps the photodiode current equal to the feedback current through Rf.  The input offset voltage due to the photodiode is very low in this self-biased photovoltaic mode. This permits a large gain without any large output offset voltage. This configuration is used with photodiodes that are illuminated with low light levels and require a lot of gain.

The DC and low-frequency gain of a transimpedance amplifier is determined by the equation
 

so
 

If the gain is large, any input offset voltage at the non-inverting input of the op-amp will result in an output DC offset.  An input bias current on the inverting terminal of the op-amp will similarly result in an output offset.  To minimize these effects, transimpedance amplifiers are usually designed with field-effect transistor (FET) input op-amps that have very low input offset voltages.

An inverting TIA can also be used with the photodiode operating in the photoconductive mode, as shown in figure 2.  A positive voltage at the cathode of the photodiode applies a reverse bias.  This reverse bias increases the width of the depletion region and lowers the junction capacitance, improving the high-frequency performance.  The photoconductive configuration of a transimpedance photodiode amplifier is used where higher bandwidth is required.  The feedback capacitor Cf is usually required to improve stability.

Bandwidth and stability

The frequency response of a transimpedance amplifier is inversely proportional to the gain set by the feedback resistor.  The sensors which transimpedance amplifiers are used with usually have more capacitance than an op-amp can handle.  The sensor can be  modeled as a current source and a capacitor Ci.  This capacitance across the input terminals of the op-amp, which includes the internal capacitance of the op-amp, introduces a low-pass filter in the feedback path.  The low-pass response of this filter can be characterized as the feedback factor:

 

When the effect of this low-pass filter response is considered, the circuit's response equation becomes:

 

where  is the open-loop gain of the op-amp.

At low frequencies the feedback factor β has little effect on the amplifier response.  The amplifier response will be close to the ideal:

 

as long as the loop gain :  is much greater than unity.

In the Bode plot of a transimpedance amplifier with no compensation, the flat curve with the peak, labeled I-to-V gain, is the frequency response of the transimpedance amplifier. The peaking of the gain curve is typical of uncompensated or poorly compensated transimpedance amplifiers. The curve labeled AOL is the open-loop response of the amplifier.  The feedback factor, plotted as a reciprocal, is labeled 1/β. In Fig. 4 the 1/β curve and AOL form an isosceles triangle with the frequency axis. The two sides have equal but opposite slopes, since one is the result of a first-order pole, and the other of a first-order zero. Each slope has a magnitude of 20 dB/decade, corresponding to a phase shift of 90°.  When the amplifier's 180° of phase inversion is added to this, the result is a full 360° at the fi intercept, indicated by the dashed vertical line. At that intercept, 1/β = AOL for a loop gain of AOLβ = 1. Oscillation will occur at the frequency fi because of the 360° phase shift, or positive feedback, and the unity gain. To mitigate these effects, designers of transimpedance amplifiers add a small-value compensating capacitor (Cf in the figure above) in parallel with the feedback resistor. When this feedback capacitor is considered, the compensated feedback factor becomes

 

The feedback capacitor produces a zero, or deflection in the response curve, at the frequency

 

This counteracts the pole produced by Ci at the frequency

 

The Bode plot of a transimpedance amplifier that has a compensation capacitor in the feedback path is shown in Fig. 5, where the compensated feedback factor plotted as a reciprocal, 1/β, starts to roll off before fi, reducing the slope at the intercept.  The loop gain is still unity, but the total phase shift is not a full 360°.  One of the requirements for oscillation is eliminated with the addition of the compensation capacitor, and so the circuit has stability.  This also reduces the gain peaking, producing a flatter overall response.  There are several methods used to calculate the compensation capacitor's value.  A compensation capacitor that has a too large value will reduce the bandwidth of the amplifier.  If the capacitor is too small, then oscillation may occur.  One difficulty with this method of phase compensation is the resulting small value of the capacitor, and the iterative method often required to optimize the value.  There is no explicit formula for calculating the capacitor value that works for all cases.  A compensation method that uses a larger-value capacitor that is not as susceptible to parasitic capacitance effects can also be used.

Noise considerations
In most practical cases, the dominant source of noise in a transimpedance amplifier is the feedback resistor. The output-referred voltage noise is directly the voltage noise over the feedback resistance. This Johnson–Nyquist noise has an RMS amplitude 

 
For a good noise performance, a high feedback resistance should thus be used. However, a larger feedback resistance increases the output voltage swing, and consequently a higher gain from the operational amplifier is needed, demanding an operational amplifier with a high gain-bandwidth product. The feedback resistance and therefore the sensitivity are thus limited by the required operating frequency of the transimpedance amplifier.

Derivation for TIA with op-amp

The noise current of the feedback resistor equals . Because of virtual ground at the negative input of the amplifier  holds.

We therefore get for the root mean square (RMS) noise output voltage . A high feedback resistor is desirable because the transimpedance of the amplifier grows linearly with the resistance but the output noise only grows with the square root of the feedback resistance.

Discrete TIA design
It is also possible to construct a transimpedance amplifier with discrete components using a field effect transistor for the gain element.  This has been done where a very low noise figure was required.

See also
PIN diode
Optical communication

Sources

References

Analog circuits
Electronic amplifiers